Tunisia competed at the 1996 Summer Olympics in Atlanta, United States. 51 competitors, 45 men and 6 women, took part in 24 events in 9 sports.

Medalists

Bronze
 Fethi Missaoui — Boxing, Men's Light Welterweight

Athletics

Men
Track and road events

Field events

Women
Field events

Boxing

Fencing

Football

Men's tournament

Group stage - Group A

 

Team roster

Chokri El-Ouaer
Imed Ben Younes
Mehdi Ben Slimane
Ferid Chouchane
Kaies Ghodhbane
Maher Kanzari
Lotfi Baccouche
Hassen Gabsi
Zoubaier Baya
Marouane Bokri
Sabri Jaballah
Mohamed Mkacher
Radhi Jaïdi
Tarek Ben Chrouda
Adel Sellimi
Khaled Badra
Riadh Bouazizi

Judo

Men

Women

Table tennis

Tennis

Women

Volleyball

Men's tournament

Group B

|}

|}

Team Roster
Ghazi Koubaa
Riadh Hedhili
Mohamed Baghdadi
Riadh Ghandri
Atif Loukil
Khaled Bel Aïd
Hichem Ben Romdhane
Tarek Aouni
Faycal Ben Amara
Noureddine Hfaiedh
Ghazi Guidara
Majdi Toumi

Wrestling

Men's Greco-Roman

References

External links
Official Olympic Reports
International Olympic Committee results database

1996 in Tunisian sport
Nations at the 1996 Summer Olympics
1996